Mr Nigeria is a male pageant which selects contestants to compete at Mister World. Although ran by several organisers in previous decades, the current franchise holder is Silverbird Group who also organise Most Beautiful Girl in Nigeria.

The 2018 titleholder was Pure Physics graduate Nelson Enwerem.

Competition
The criteria for the competition includes Nigerian citizenship and at least a WAEC certificate, with the age limit being 18–25. Catwalk experience is also preferred, but not necessary. Prizes for the winner vary each year, but have always included cash; as of 2014, it stands at N1,000,000, and some winners have also received a car.

International level
While Mr Nigeria is not as popular or consistent as MBGN, representatives from the Silverbird version have performed notably better than their female counterparts at international level, with three of its four winners placing at Mister World. Its biggest achievement to date was in 2014 when Emmanuel Ikubese emerged first runner-up at Mister World 2014 behind Danish carpenter Nicklas Pedersen.

Title holders (Silverbird edition)

References

Beauty pageants in Nigeria
Nigeria
Nigerian awards
Silverbird Group